F1 Manager may refer to:
 F1 Manager (2000 video game), a Microsoft Windows video game by EA Sports
 F1 Manager (2019 video game), an iOS/Android video game by Hutch
 F1 Manager 2022, a multiplatform video game by Frontier Developments